John Alexander McCormick (24 November 1899 – 22 January 1974) was an Australian rules footballer who played with Richmond in the Victorian Football League (VFL).

McCormick enlisted in the Royal Australian Air Force at Point Cook in 1926 and remained a career officer through World War II until his retirement in 1948.

Notes

External links 

John McCormick's playing statistics from The VFA Project

1899 births
1974 deaths
Australian rules footballers from Victoria (Australia)
Richmond Football Club players
Hawthorn Football Club (VFA) players